Arenibacter troitsensis is a heterotrophic, aerobic and non-motile bacterium from the genus Arenibacter which has been isolated from marine bottom sediments from the Gulf of Peter the Great in the Sea of Japan.

References

External links
Type strain of Arenibacter troitsensis at BacDive -  the Bacterial Diversity Metadatabase	

Flavobacteria
Bacteria described in 2003